Paper Technology is the official journal of the Paper Industry Technical Association and is a technical publication for  the paper industry and its allied trades. It was started in 1960. The headquarters of the journal is in London.

References

External links
 Official website

Business magazines published in the United Kingdom
Magazines established in 1960
Packaging magazines and journals
Papermaking
Professional and trade magazines
Magazines published in London